Stone Crazy is the second studio album by American hip hop duo The Beatnuts. It was released on June 24, 1997 via Relativity Records. Recording sessions took place at Worldwide Studios. Produced solely by the Beatnuts, it features guest appearances from Big Pun, Blaq Poet, Cuban Link, Don Gobbi, Gab Gotcha, Horny Man and Hostyle. Member Fashion left the group to pursue a solo career and is not featured on the album.

The album reached number 154 on the Billboard 200 and number 38 on the Top R&B/Hip-Hop Albums in the United States, and is considered their breakthrough album. It contains four singles: "Find That", "Do You Believe?", "Off the Books" and "Here's a Drink".

Track listing

Personnel
Lester "Psycho Les" Fernandez – vocals, producer (tracks: 2, 4, 5, 7, 9, 10, 12-17)
Jerry "JuJu" Tineo – vocals, producer (tracks: 2, 4, 5, 7, 9, 10, 12-17)
Gabriel "Gab Gotcha" Velasquez – vocals (track 2)
Christopher "Big Pun" Rios – vocals (track 5)
Felix "Cuban Link" Delgado – vocals (track 5)
Fredrick "Hostyle" Ivey – vocals (track 14)
Wilbur "Blaq Poet" Bass – vocals (track 14)
Don Gobbi – vocals (track 15)
Jose C. "Horny Man" Perez Sanchez – vocals (track 17)
Herbert Powers Jr. – mastering (tracks: 1-3, 5, 6, 8-15, 17)
Michael Sarsfield – mastering (tracks: 4, 7, 16)
David Bett – art direction
Chiu Liu – design
Michael Lavine – photography

Charts

Singles

References

External links

1997 albums
The Beatnuts albums
Relativity Records albums
Albums produced by the Beatnuts